"The Uninhabitable Earth" is an article by American journalist David Wallace-Wells published in the July 10, 2017 issue of New York magazine. The long-form article depicts a worst-case scenario of what might happen in the near-future due to global warming. The article starts with the statement "[i]f your anxiety about global warming is dominated by fears of sea level rise, you are barely scratching the surface of what terrors are possible." The story was the most read article in the history of the magazine.

The article became the inspiration for The Uninhabitable Earth: Life After Warming, a book-length treatment of the ideas explored in the original essay.

General
On November 20, 2017, NYU's Arthur L. Carter Journalism Institute hosted a 2-hour-long conversation between Wallace-Wells and Michael E. Mann to discuss the controversy around the article.

Accompanying the article are a series of extended interviews with scientists. These include paleontologist Peter Ward, climatologist Michael E. Mann, oceanographer Wallace Smith Broecker, climatologist James Hansen and scientist Michael Oppenheimer. In addition an annotated edition of the article was published online that includes inline footnotes.

In February 2019, Wallace-Wells published The Uninhabitable Earth: Life After Warming. The book was excerpted in The Guardian.

Reception
The story received immediate criticism from the climate change community along two fronts: the piece is too pessimistic; or it contains some factual errors. The NGO Climate Feedback summarized reviews by dozens of professional scientists, summarizing that, "The reviewers found that some statements in this complex article do misrepresent research on the topic, and some others lack the necessary context to be clearly understood by the reader. Many other explanations in the article are correct, but readers are likely left with an overall conclusion that is exaggerated compared to our best scientific understanding." Jason Samenow referred to it as a "climate doom piece" because Wallace-Wells presents some of the worse case scenarios without admission they are "remote" possibilities, and without exploring the more likely outcomes, which are still very serious. With reference to factual errors, Michael Mann and several others specifically criticized the description of Arctic methane emissions. In his conversation with Mann at NYU, Wallace-Wells noted that he would not include comments on methane release if he were to write the piece again.

Some journalists defended the science saying it is mostly correct, "I haven't seen any good evidence for serious factual errors," said Kevin Drum. Emily Atkin said "The complaints about the science in Wallace-Wells’s article are mostly quibbles". Robinson Meyer of The Atlantic said it is an "unusually specific and severe depiction of what global warming will do to the planet." Susan Matthews writing in Slate said "The instantly viral piece might be the Silent Spring of our time". The major criticism is that David Wallace-Wells was trying to scare people. This theme was then explored by journalists and commentators with some saying they thought fear was necessary given the reality of the problem, while others thought scaring people was counter-productive. For example, Eric Holthaus said that "scaring the shit out of [people] is a really bad strategy" for getting them to want to address climate change.

In a later interview, Wallace-Wells said that "it didn’t seem plausible to me that there was more risk at scaring people too much than there was at not scaring them enough ... my feeling was, and is, if there's a one percent chance that we’ve set off a chain reaction that could end the human race, then that should be something that the public knows and thinks about."

References

External links
 
 

Works originally published in New York (magazine)
Climate change mass media
2017 essays